The Harbour Cay Condominium was a five-story flat plate residential development project in Cocoa Beach (Brevard County, Florida, United States) that collapsed during construction on March 27, 1981. Eleven workers were killed and 27 injured.

The building, being constructed by the Univel Corporation of Cocoa Beach, collapsed as workers were completing its framework by pouring concrete for the roof.
The accident led to more rigorous enforcement of engineering and construction codes in Florida and elsewhere.

Cause
The collapse was due to numerous errors in design and construction. Other design and construction errors, omissions, and deficiencies are identified in the Department of Commerce report, including issues with reshores and missing design checks for punching shear.

Department of Commerce report stated “The analysis showed that shear stresses in the slab at many column locations on the fifth floor exceeded the nominal shear strength. Thus, punching shear failure at one of the columns precipitated a progressive failure of the slab throughout the entire fifth floor.”

Charges
Two engineers, an architect, and two contractors were charged with negligence, misconduct and failing to conform to state and local building laws.  Both of the engineers surrendered their license to practice engineering in the state of Florida, paid fines, and promised to never practice in Florida again; litigation against the architect and contractors continued. According to Mike Thomas of the Orlando Sentinel on April 20, 1997, the local contractor, Univel, folded almost immediately. The senior developer, and the real money behind the project, contractor Towne Realty out of Milwaukee, agreed to a settlement out of court to avoid litigation. They have continued to develop properties to this day.

Actions
Florida Threshold Inspector requirements were enacted after the collapse.

See also
Surfside condominium collapse
2000 Commonwealth Avenue collapse
List of structural failures and collapses

References

1981 disasters in the United States
1981 in Florida
Building collapses in the United States
Buildings and structures in Brevard County, Florida
Cocoa Beach, Florida
Construction accidents in the United States
Disasters in Florida
Condominiums in the United States